The Canadian Bulletin of Medical History is a peer-reviewed academic journal for the history of medicine, health, and related fields. Its aim is to situate the history of health, medicine, and biomedical science within local, regional, and international contexts. It publishes articles in French and English, and is published twice a year by the University of Toronto Press.

Abstracting and indexing
The journal is abstracted and indexed in:
 America: History and Life
 America: History and Life with Full Text
 Biomedical Reference Collection: Corporate Edition
 Canadian Periodical Index
 History of Science, Technology & Medicine
 PubMed
 Scopus

References

External links

University of Toronto Press academic journals
Biannual journals
Publications established in 1984
English-language journals